Jagjiwan College is a constituent college of Veer Kunwar Singh University in Chandawa in Arrah, Bihar, India. Established in 1959, the college is named after Indian independence activist and former Deputy Prime Minister, Jagjivan Ram.

References

Veer Kunwar Singh University
Educational institutions established in 1959
1959 establishments in Bihar